Sipho Dlamini is a Swazi Olympic middle-distance runner. He represented his country in the men's 1500 meters and the men's 800 meters at the 1992 Summer Olympics. His times were a 1:48.70 and a 3:46.33.

References

1972 births
Living people
Swazi male middle-distance runners
Olympic athletes of Eswatini
Athletes (track and field) at the 1992 Summer Olympics